Mechtild Widrich is an Austrian art historian, curator, and Professor at the School of the Art Institute of Chicago.

Educated at University of Vienna, the Free University Berlin (M.Phil Art History, University of Vienna) and the MIT School of Architecture (PhD History, Theory, and Criticism of Art and Architecture), Widrich taught art and architectural history at the University of Vienna, the ETH Zürich, the University of Zürich, the Academy of Fine Arts Vienna, the Eikones Summer School at University of Basel and the University of Applied Arts Vienna.

After a postdoctoral curatorial position at the National Gallery in Washington D.C. (2009–10) and a junior faculty position at ETH Zurich (2011–13), she was a senior research fellow at the Eikones Center for the Theory and History of the Image at University of Basel from 2011-13. In 2014, Widrich was appointed Professor of Contemporary Art History at the University of Vienna, and also in the Art History, Theory, and Criticism department of the School of the Art Institute of Chicago, where she started teaching in fall 2015. Widrich is a 2022-23 faculty fellow at the Notre Dame Institute for Advanced Study.

Widrich was on the Academic Advisory Board of the Jewish Museum Vienna from 2011 to 2022, and on the expert committee for the recontextualization of the monument to Karl Lueger in Vienna (2022).

Widrich serves in numerous capacities on international expert committees for academic publications: she is currently member of the scientific committee of Cadernos de Arte Pública, Vesper. Journal for Architecture, Arts and Theory, and Život umjetnosti and, from 2019 to 2022, served as reviews editor and board member of Art Journal.

Research
Widrich works on monuments, architecture, and performance in public space. In her book Performative Monuments, Widrich coins the title phrase, 'performative monument', to explain why live body art influenced interactive memorials since the 1980s, building on the definition of anti-authoritarian countermonuments proposed by German artist Jochen Gerz, and the speech-act theory of British philosopher J. L. Austin. The concept has been taken up in recent literature on commemoration and public art, and by artists, notably Doris Salcedo. Her book Monumental Cares. Sites of History and Contemporary Art, 2023, is "a provocative volume that is academically rigorous, and it will enrich the public debate on commemoration with its sophisticated reflections on notions of temporality and authenticity of historical markers, siting, and public participation, at a moment when monuments have been at the forefront of political activism."

In the field of performance studies, Widrich is known for her Work on Viennese Actionism, VALIE EXPORT and Marina Abramovic, with particular focus on the documentation and mediation of events, repetition, and the layering of diverse audiences over time.

Widrich also works on aesthetic theory, in particular ugliness. Together with art historian Andrei Pop, she is the co-editor and co-translator of the first book-length philosophical treatment of the topic, Karl Rosenkranz's 1853 Aesthetics of Ugliness, and co-editor of the book Ugliness. The Non-Beautiful in Art and Theory.

Books
 Monumental Cares. Sites of History and Contemporary Art. Manchester University Press 2023.
 Participation in Art and Architecture. London: Tauris, 2016 / Bloomsbury, 2022.
 Presence: A Conversation at Cabaret Voltaire. Berlin: Sternberg Press, 2016.
 Translation and ed. of Karl Rosenkranz, Aesthetics of Ugliness (1853), London: Bloomsbury, 2015.
 Performative Monuments: The Rematerialisation of Public Art. Manchester University Press 2014.
 Ugliness: The Non-Beautiful in Art and Theory. London: Tauris, 2013 / Bloomsbury, 2016.
 Krzysztof Wodiczko, City of Refuge: A 9-11 Memorial. London: Black Dog, 2009.
 Leopoldstadt: die Andere Heimatkunde. Vienna: Brandstätter, 1999.

Curating
There is Nothing to See Here, 2010, Modern Lab, National Gallery of Art, Washington, D.C.

Sounding the Subject, 2007, List Visual Arts Center, MIT, co-curated with Daniel Birnbaum.

Remembrance/Renewal ("Installation der Erinnerung"), 1995, permanent installation by Nancy Spero at the Jewish Museum Vienna.

References 

Living people
School of the Art Institute of Chicago faculty
Art Institute of Chicago
University of Vienna alumni
Year of birth missing (living people)
MIT School of Architecture and Planning alumni
Austrian art historians